Lyubov Daniilovna Ozeretskovskaya (née Andreyeva, born 21 November 1996) is a female racing driver and sim racer from Kazakhstan.

Career
Having started her career in karting in her native Kazakhstan, Andreyeva moved to Russia to contest the local Formula Masters championship in 2014. She twinned her Formula Masters campaign with several outings in the Formula BMW AsiaCup series in 2015, before cutting back to Formula Masters only from 2016. She contested one final season in 2017 before running out of funding and setting up the Russian arm of a Bulgarian sim racing company with her partner Vladimir.

Married in late 2018, Ozeretskovskaya was accepted into the 2019 W Series evaluation but failed to make the grid. She competed in the first two rounds of the 2019 Formula 4 South East Asia Championship, but sat out the remainder of the season recovering from foot surgery having scored a best finish of 7th in Sepang.

She gave up circuit racing at the end of 2019, moving into eSports and becoming an iRacing–focused Twitch streamer. Ozeretskovskaya returned to Kazakhstan in 2022 during the Russo-Ukrainian War.

Racing record

Career summary

References

External links
 

1996 births
Living people
Female racing drivers
Kazakhstani motorsport people
Formula 4 drivers
Team Meritus drivers
Sportspeople from Almaty
Twitch (service) streamers